Jim Higgins is a retired American ice hockey player and coach. Higgins is most remembered for his time at Princeton, coaching the Tigers for 14 years after spending the preceding decade building a coaching career. While Higgins failed to produce a single winning season during his time as a college head coach he is nevertheless the winningest ice hockey coach at Princeton since World War II (as of 2019). In recognition of his career Higgins was awarded the John "Snooks" Kelly Founders Award in 2013.

Regular season and playoffs

Head coaching record

References

External links

American men's ice hockey defensemen
Boston University Terriers men's ice hockey players
Colgate Raiders men's ice hockey coaches
Ice hockey coaches from Massachusetts
Living people
Princeton Tigers men's ice hockey coaches
Sportspeople from Cambridge, Massachusetts
Year of birth missing (living people)
Ice hockey players from Massachusetts